Beckham is an unincorporated community in Appomattox County, Virginia, United States.  It was a post village until some time in the 20th century.

References

Unincorporated communities in Appomattox County, Virginia